OLCC may refer to:
 Oregon Liquor and Cannabis Commission
 Orthodox Lutheran Confessional Conference
 Old Leightonians Cricket Club